Cloudripper is a 13,525-foot-elevation (4,122 meter) mountain summit located two miles east of the crest of the Sierra Nevada mountain range in Inyo County of northern California, United States. It is situated in the Palisades area of the John Muir Wilderness, on land managed by Inyo National Forest. Cloudripper ranks as the 58th highest summit in California, and the highest point of the Inconsolable Range.

Climbing
Established climbing routes on Cloudripper:

 East Ridge via Big Pine Lakes – 
 North Ridge via Green Lake – class 2 
 West Chute via Chocolate Lake – class 3 

The first ascent of the summit was made June 15, 1927, by Norman Clyde, who is credited with 130 first ascents, most of which were in the Sierra Nevada. Other sources place the date as June 15, 1926.

Climate
According to the Köppen climate classification system, Cloudripper is located in an alpine climate zone. Most weather fronts originate in the Pacific Ocean, and travel east toward the Sierra Nevada mountains. As fronts approach, they are forced upward by the peaks, causing them to drop their moisture in the form of rain or snowfall onto the range (orographic lift). Precipitation runoff from this mountain drains east into North Fork Big Pine Creek, and northwest into headwaters of Bishop Creek.

Gallery

See also
 
 List of the major 4000-meter summits of California

References

External links
 Weather forecast: Cloudripper
 

Inyo National Forest
Mountains of Inyo County, California
Mountains of the John Muir Wilderness
North American 4000 m summits
Mountains of Northern California
Sierra Nevada (United States)